Go Fish is a 1994 American drama film written by Guinevere Turner and Rose Troche and directed by Rose Troche. The film was a groundbreaking, hip, low-budget comedy that celebrated lesbian culture on all levels, and launched the career of director Troche and Turner. It premiered at the Sundance Film Festival in 1994, and was the first film to be sold to a distributor, Samuel Goldwyn, during that event for $450,000. The film was released during gay pride month in June 1994 and eventually grossed $2.4 million. Go Fish proved the marketability of lesbian issues for the film industry.

Plot
Max is a young lesbian college student in Chicago who has gone ten months without having sex. She and her roommate and college professor Kia are in a coffee shop when they run into Ely, a hippieish woman with long braided hair, whom Max initially dismisses. Max and Ely do end up going to a film together. After the film they return to Ely's place and, after some flirtatious conversation, they kiss. Suddenly a call comes in from Ely's (unseen on-screen) partner Kate, with whom Ely has been in a long-distance relationship for more than two years, which puts a bit of a damper on things.

Ely decides to cut off all her hair, ending up with a very short butch style. She runs into Max in a bookstore and Max almost does not recognize her.

Kia's girlfriend Evy returns home. Her ex-boyfriend Junior is there. Evy's mother confronts her, saying that Junior told her that he had spotted Evy at a gay bar. Evy's mother kicks her out and Evy flees to Kia's place and Max invites her to live with them.

Ely and her roommate Daria throw a dinner party and, after a spirited game of I Never, Max and Ely reconnect. They make plans to go out again and then begin kissing. They have several phone conversations, in the course of which Ely reveals that she's "sort of broken up" with Kate. They get together for a second date but they never make it out of the apartment. Max ends up trimming Ely's fingernails. This turns into foreplay and they have sex. Intercut with the closing credits are shots and short scenes of Max and Ely's burgeoning relationship.

Cast
 Guinevere Turner as Camille 'Max' West
 V.S. Brodie as Ely
 T. Wendy McMillan as Kia
 Anastasia Sharp as Daria
 Migdalia Melendez as Evy
 Scout as Hairdresser
 Dave Troche as Junior

Production
Rose Troche and Guinevere Turner read B. Ruby Rich's article "New Queer Cinema" in Sight and Sound and were inspired to contact Christine Vachon for production support. The script was written collaboratively between Troche and Turner and the film took about three years to finish. Prior to writing the film, the pair had worked on projects for ACT UP Chicago. Actors for the film were friends, people spotted around town, or volunteers pulled from open casting calls.

Reception
 Variety summarized it as "a fresh, hip comedy about contemporary lifestyles within the lesbian community. Theatrical prospects are excellent for an all-female picture that is sharply observed, visually audacious and full of surprising charms". The Rolling Stone commented that "Troche brings an engagingly light touch to material that ranges from negotiating girl bars to maintaining friendships".

IndieWire ranked it in 5th place on its list of the 15 Greatest Lesbian Movies of All Time.

Rita Kempley of The Washington Post wrote "Go Fish hasn't got an agenda unless it's that girls just gotta have fun". Melissa Pierson of Entertainment Weekly gave the film a "B+", explaining her reasoning by writing that "In matters of both sex and artistic license, this is a rental to make you say, "Vive la difference"".

Awards and nominations
 Berlin International Film Festival Teddy Award winner for Best Feature Film (1994)
 Deauville Film Festival Audience Award winner and Critics Award nomination for Rose Troche (1994)
 GLAAD Media Awards winner for Best Feature (1994)
 Gotham Awards Open Palm Award for Rose Troche (1994)
 Independent Spirit Awards nomination for Best Supporting Female for V. S. Brodie (1995)
 Political Film Society Award for Human Rights nomination (1995)
 Sundance Film Festival Grand Jury Prize nomination (1994)

See also
 List of LGBT-related films directed by women
 List of lesbian filmmakers

References

External links
 
 
 
 

1994 independent films
1994 LGBT-related films
1990s romantic comedy-drama films
1990s feminist films
American black-and-white films
American independent films
American romantic comedy-drama films
1990s English-language films
American LGBT-related films
Lesbian-related films
Killer Films films
The Samuel Goldwyn Company films
Films set in Chicago
LGBT-related romantic comedy-drama films
1994 directorial debut films
1994 comedy films
1994 drama films
1990s American films